Ozona Air Force Station (ADC ID: TM-187) is a closed United States Air Force General Surveillance Radar station. It was closed in 1963.

History
Ozona Air Force Station came into existence as part of Phase III of the Air Defense Command Mobile Radar program. On October 20, 1953 ADC requested a third phase of twenty-five radar sites be constructed.  Ozona Was The Top 30 Air Force Stations.

The 732d Aircraft Control and Warning Squadron was assigned to Oznoma AFS by the 33d Air Division on 8 November 1956.  It began operating an AN/FPS-3 search radar and an AN/FPS-6 height-finder radar at the station, and initially the station functioned as a Ground-Control Intercept (GCI) and warning station.  As a GCI station, the squadron's role was to guide interceptor aircraft toward unidentified intruders picked up on the unit's radar scopes.

In addition to the main facility, Ozona operated several AN/FPS-14 Gap Filler sites:
 McCamey, TX     (TM-187A): 
 Comstock, TX    (TM-187B): 

Ozona was closed in 1963 due to budget reductions. Operations ceased on 1 August 1963 and the squadron was discontinued.  Today, what was Ozona Air Force Station is privately owned. The station is abandoned, the remaining buildings are frozen in time complete with electrical wires connected to substation which no longer remains.   Most of the buildings that remain are in a very deteriorated condition.  The former Air Force housing area is in use as single family residences, now called "Crockett Heights". Family's that live in "Crockett Heights" are currently living in old houses that the Military used as the barracks/houses. The houses residences live in, are rebuilt, and are in a perfect condition.

Ozona AFS most important mission was during the Cuban Missile Crisis.  Its Radars and radio were used to keep track of the U2's being flown out of Laughlin AFB on their flights over Cuba.  The crisis delayed closing the base for another year.

Air Force units and assignments 
Units:
 732d Aircraft Control and Warning Squadron, Assigned 25 July 1957 to Ozona Air Force Station
 Activated on 8 November 1956 by 33d AD at Oklahoma City AFS
 Discontinued on 1 August 1963

Assignments:
 33d Air Division, 25 July 1957
 Albuquerque Air Defense Sector, 1 January 1960
 Oklahoma City Air Defense Sector, 15 September 1960
 4752d Air Defense Wing, 1 September 1961
 Oklahoma City Air Defense Sector, 25 June-1 August 1963

See also
 List of USAF Aerospace Defense Command General Surveillance Radar Stations

References

  A Handbook of Aerospace Defense Organization 1946 - 1980,  by Lloyd H. Cornett and Mildred W. Johnson, Office of History, Aerospace Defense Center, Peterson Air Force Base, Colorado
 Winkler, David F. (1997), Searching the skies: the legacy of the United States Cold War defense radar program. Prepared for United States Air Force Headquarters Air Combat Command.
 for Ozona AFS, TX

Radar stations of the United States Air Force
Aerospace Defense Command military installations
Installations of the United States Air Force in Texas
Military installations closed in 1963
1957 establishments in Texas
1963 disestablishments in Texas
Military installations established in 1957